Callistephin is an anthocyanin. It is the 3-O-glucoside of pelargonidin.

It is found in pomegranate juice, in strawberries and in purple corn. It is also found in the berry skins of Cabernet Sauvignon and Pinot Noir grapes (Vitis vinifera L.).

See also 
Callistephus

References 

Anthocyanins
Flavonoid glucosides